The National Film Development Corporation Malaysia, abbreviated FINAS, is the central government agency for the film industry of Malaysia. FINAS is similar to the Motion Picture Association of America in the United States. In 2013, the corporation was merged with Filem Negara Malaysia (FNM) to form a sole film agency.

History 
The National Film Development Corporation (FINAS) is the result of a decision made by the National Film Development Committee set up by the Malaysian government on 26 July 1980 to devise ways to develop a film company in Malaysia. The result of the National Film Development Committee's National Film Development Corporation was set up on 1 June 1981, and started operation in Jalan Ampang then moved to Studio Merdeka Complex, Hulu Kelang on 19 December 1988, when Tan Sri Abdul Samad Idris was the chairman of Finas.

Starting from 27 December 2004, FINAS was later placed under the Ministry of Culture, Arts and Heritage of Malaysia and was the agency of the Ministry of Arts and Heritage Culture Unity beginning in 2008. From April 2008, FINAS was placed under the Ministry of Information, Communication and Culture.

Finas is involved in the promotion of filming in Malaysia, and with the implementation of the Investors Promotion Act, 1986 also censured local film and video production activities. Finas also established the Film Academy in 1987, aimed at providing short term formal training, certificate and diploma levels to employees interested in film production. In addition, local filmmakers also enjoy the government's financial incentives under the Entertainment Grants Scheme.

To encourage filmmaking in Malaysia, Finas also provided assistance in the form of loan facilities and rental of shooting equipment as well as film production facilities, preview halls and studios. The government also assisted local filmmakers by offering 50% off government television advertisements by the Ministry of Information. The government has also enforced the Compulsory Terms from January 1991 in the effort to develop the Malaysian film industry administered by Finas.

On 10 April 2019, actor and producer Hans Isaac served as the Chairman of Finas, succeeding Samsuni Mohd Nor. He resign from his position on 22 May 2020 and was taken over by Zakaria Abdul Hamid, a day later, on 23 May.

On 23 July 2020, the Communications and Multimedia Ministry announced that it would impose licensing on all video recording in Malaysia, which included social media posts. This was revoked 2 days later, on 25 July 2020.

Overview

Malaysian Film Festival

Malaysian Film Festival (Malay: Festival Filem Malaysia), is a film award ceremony carried by Entertainment Journalists Association of Malaysia (EJA) to appreciate and honouring the products of film arts and artists. The formal ceremony at which the awards are presented is one of the most prominent award ceremonies and the highlights for the film industry in Malaysia and is televised live on local television, annually. It is considered to be Malaysia's own equivalent to the Academy Awards in the United States and it is among the major annual awards presented in Malaysia, alongside the Anugerah Bintang Popular for the entire entertainment industry, and Anugerah Industri Muzik for the music industry. Starting with the third inauguration, FFM was no longer being organise by EJA, but instead taken over by Finas after the second organisation of the awards ceremony.

Skim Wajib Tayang
The Skim Wajib Tayang (Compulsory Screening Scheme) is a regulation that conducted by FINAS to authorise a Compulsory Scheme Committee to consider and accept any local film or joint venture film (local and overseas) for compulsory viewing on the movie hall by the cinema operators, in accordance with the provisions of the Finas' Order which enforced on 23 June 2005 and has been revamped in 2016.

Merger with Filem Negara Malaysia
In November 2012, former Information, Communication and Culture Minister, Rais Yatim announced that FINAS and Filem Negara Malaysia (FNM) will be merged to form a sole film organization. The merger was completed on May 31, 2013 and was made to make the corporation would be responsible for the development of the local film industry to avoid wastage of funds and overlapping of provision of infrastructure. Many of the FINAS staffs were remained with the agency while others have been let go as part of their restructuring after the merger. The decision of merger between FINAS and Filem Negara was proposed in 1991, but delayed several times due to legal issues. The combined entity retained the corporation's name.

Film in Malaysia Incentive
Film in Malaysia Incentive is a program introduced by Finas in October 2014 as a historic step that will make Malaysia the preferred destination and film production hub.

Digital restoration
Since 2020, Finas have digitally restored selected documentary films (though they did not produce it) from Filem Negara Malaysia's archive, which has been aired on Bernama as well as Finas' YouTube channel under the Retrospektif banner.

See also
 Cinema of Malaysia
 Filem Negara Malaysia
 Film Censorship Board of Malaysia
 Professional Film Workers Association of Malaysia

References

External links
 

Federal ministries, departments and agencies of Malaysia
Mass media in Malaysia
1980 establishments in Malaysia
Government agencies established in 1980
Ministry of Communications and Multimedia (Malaysia)
Film organisations in Malaysia
Public service announcement organizations